The 2017 Russia Open Grand Prix is the tenth Grand Prix tournament of the 2017 BWF Grand Prix Gold and Grand Prix. The tournament was held at the Sport Hall Olympic in Vladivostok, Russia on 18–23 July 2017 and has a total purse of $65,000. The tournament is organized by the National Badminton Federation of Russia, and the scoring system of best of 5 games of 11 points will be used.

Men's singles

Seeds

 Sourabh Verma (withdrew)
 Vladimir Malkov (final)
 Soong Joo Ven (third round)
 Subhankar Dey (third round)
 Sergey Sirant (champion)
 Artem Pochtarev (third round)
 Milan Ludik (second round)
 Anand Pawar (quarterfinals)

Finals

Top half

Section 1

Section 2

Section 3

Section 4

Bottom half

Section 5

Section 6

Section 7

Section 8

Women's singles

Seeds

 Sonia Cheah Su Ya (final)
 Evgeniya Kosetskaya (champion)
 Natalia Perminova (semifinals)
 Natsuki Nidaira (semifinals)
 Shiori Saito (quarterfinals)
 Rasika Raje (quarterfinals)
 Victoria Slobodyanyuk (quarterfinals)
 Ksenia Evgenova (first round)

Finals

Top half

Section 1

Section 2

Bottom half

Section 3

Section 4

Men's doubles

Seeds

 Vladimir Ivanov / Ivan Sozonov (champion)
 Chooi Kah Ming / Low Juan Shen (final)
 Evgenij Dremin / Denis Grachev (quarterfinals)
 Arjun M.R. / Ramchandran Shlok (semifinals)

Finals

Top half

Section 1

Section 2

Bottom half

Section 3

Section 4

Women's doubles

Seeds

 Chow Mei Kuan / Lee Meng Yean (withdrew)
 Ekaterina Bolotova / Alina Davletova (semifinals)
 Delphine Delrue / Lea Palermo (second round)
 Olga Arkhangelskaya / Natalia Rogova (quarterfinals)

Finals

Top half

Section 1

Section 2

Bottom half

Section 3

Section 4

Mixed doubles

Seeds

 Evgenij Dremin / Evgenia Dimova (quarterfinals)
 Bastian Kersaudy / Lea Palermo (second round)
 Rodion Alimov / Alina Davletova (second round)
 Thom Gicquel / Delphine Delrue (quarterfinals)

Finals

Top half

Section 1

Section 2

Bottom half

Section 3

Section 4

References

External links
 Tournament Link

Russian Open (badminton)
BWF Grand Prix Gold and Grand Prix
Russian Open Grand Prix
Sport in Vladivostok